Mesothen desperata is a moth of the subfamily Arctiinae. It was described by Francis Walker in 1856. It is found in Panama and Brazil.

References

 

Mesothen (moth)
Moths described in 1856